The men's 4×200 metre freestyle relay was a swimming event held as part of the swimming at the 1912 Summer Olympics programme. It was the second appearance of the event, which had been introduced in 1908. The competition was held on Friday July 12, 1912 and Monday July 15, 1912.

Twenty swimmers from five nations competed.

Records

These were the standing world and Olympic records (in minutes) prior to the 1912 Summer Olympics.

All five teams swam in times under the standing world record in the semifinals. The Americans, by virtue of winning the first semifinal, held the new record only until the Australasian team won the second in a better time. The Australasians bettered their own record in the final, making the 4x200 free relay an event in which the Olympic record (and world record) was broken each heat.

Results

Semifinals

The top two from each heat and the fastest of third place teams advanced.  Since there were only five teams that started, this resulted in all five advancing to the finals with no team eliminated by the semifinals.

Semifinal 1

Semifinal 2

Final

References

 
 

Swimming at the 1912 Summer Olympics
4 × 200 metre freestyle relay
Men's events at the 1912 Summer Olympics